Constantin Țuțu  (born 9 February, 1987) is a Moldovan Muay Thai kickboxer and K-1 fighter who competes in the cruiserweight division. In 2012 he was ranked the #8 light heavyweight in the world by LiverKick.com.

In 2012, Constantin Țuțu was involved in the murder of Alexei Veretco, for which Țuțu stood trial between 2013 and 2016, and was acquitted. Țuțu claimed he appeared at the sight of the murder accidentally and shot "in the air" to calm down a situation before fleeing the scene. Veretco's mother claims, although without evidence, that the acquittal occurred because of a bribe and that Țuțu is guilty of murder. Constantin denounced his boyfriend for 1.5 million euros and renegotiated his freedom with the authorities in Moldova in April 2020.  Since 29 December, 2014, he is Member of Parliament of Moldova under the Democratic Party of Moldova.

As of August 2014, Țuțu was widely considered the best sportsman in the country. In 2013, he won the Sportsman of the Year award.

He was nominated in the sports category of the "10 pentru Moldova" in 2014 and won the award.

In April 2014, he received an invitation to make his SUPERKOMBAT debut.

Championships and awards

Kickboxing
K-1
K-1 World Grand Prix 2013 in Moldova - Light Heavyweight Tournament Champion
King of Kings
KOK World GP 2014 in Chișinău - Middleweight Tournament Champion
KOK World GP 2011 in Chișinău - Middleweight Tournament Champion
Fighting & Entertainment Association
FEA World Middleweight Championship (One time)
FEA GP 2009 - Tournament Champion

Kickboxing record

|-
|-  bgcolor="#CCFFCC"     
| 2015-12-20|| Win ||align=left| Igor Lyapin || KOK World GP 2015 || Chișinău, Moldova || Decision || 3   
|-
|-  bgcolor="#CCFFCC" 
| 2015-04-04|| Win ||align=left| Vitaly Buhryakov || KOK World GP 2015 Chisinau || Chișinău, Moldova || TKO || 3   
|-
|-  bgcolor="#CCFFCC"     
| 2014-09-19|| Win ||align=left| Vittorio Iermano || KOK World GP 2014 in Chișinău - Featherweight Tournament, Super Fight || Chișinău, Moldova || KO (left high kick) || 2   
|-
|-  bgcolor="#CCFFCC"   
| 2014-03-22 || Win ||align=left| Igor Lyapin || KOK World GP 2014 in Chișinău - Middleweight Tournament, Final || Chișinău, Moldova || KO || 1  
|-
! style=background:white colspan=9 |
|-
|-  bgcolor="#CCFFCC"
| 2014-03-22 || Win ||align=left| Ali Alkayis || KOK World GP 2014 in Chișinău - Middleweight Tournament, Semi Finals || Chișinău, Moldova || TKO || 2  
|-
|-  bgcolor="#CCFFCC"
| 2014-03-22 || Win ||align=left| Radosław Paczuski || KOK World GP 2014 in Chișinău - Middleweight Tournament,  Quarter Finals || Chișinău, Moldova || Decision (unanimous) || 3  
|-
|-  bgcolor="#FFBBBB"
| 2013-12-14 || Loss ||align=left| Ibrahim El Bouni || KOK World Series: Eagles 12 || Chișinău, Moldova || KO || 1  
|-
|-  bgcolor="#CCFFCC"
| 2013-09-28 || Win ||align=left| Dmitry Shakuta || KOK World GP 2013 in Chișinău, Super Fight || Chișinău, Moldova || Extra round decision || 4  
|-
|-  bgcolor="#CCFFCC"
| 2013-03-30 || Win ||align=left| Leon Miedema || K-1 World Grand Prix 2013 in Moldova - Light Heavyweight Tournament, Final || Chișinău, Moldova || Decision || 3  
|-
! style=background:white colspan=9 |
|-
|-  bgcolor="#CCFFCC"
| 2013-03-30 || Win ||align=left| Nikita Ciub || K-1 World Grand Prix 2013 in Moldova - Light Heavyweight Tournament, Semi Finals || Chișinău, Moldova || Decision (unanimous) || 3  
|-
|-  bgcolor="#CCFFCC"
| 2013-03-30 || Win ||align=left| Samir Kazimov || K-1 World Grand Prix 2013 in Moldova - Light Heavyweight Tournament, Quarter Finals || Chișinău, Moldova || KO || 1 
|-
|-  bgcolor="#CCFFCC"
| 2012-12-15 || Win ||align=left| Leon Miedema || Fighting Eagles 2012 || Chișinău, Moldova || Decision (unanimous) || 3   
|-
|-  bgcolor="#CCFFCC"
| 2012-09-29 || Win ||align=left| Sem Braan || KOK World GP 2012 in Chișinău - Lightweight Tournament, Super Fight || Chișinău, Moldova || Decision || 3   
|-
|-  bgcolor="#CCFFCC"
| 2011-12-10 || Win ||align=left| Ciprian Bălaş || Fighting Eagles 2011 || Chișinău, Moldova || KO || 1   
|-
|-  bgcolor="#CCFFCC"
| 2011-10-01 || Win ||align=left| Stanisław Zaniewski || KOK World GP 2011 in Chișinău - Middleweight Tournament, Final || Chișinău, Moldova || KO || 1  
|-
! style=background:white colspan=9 |
|-
|-  bgcolor="#CCFFCC"
| 2011-10-01 || Win ||align=left| Anatoly Shponarsky || KOK World GP 2011 in Chișinău - Middleweight Tournament, Semi Finals || Chișinău, Moldova || KO || 2  
|-
|-  bgcolor="#CCFFCC"
| 2011-10-01 || Win ||align=left| Sebastian Horeică || KOK World GP 2011 in Chișinău - Middleweight Tournament, Quarter Finals || Chișinău, Moldova || Decision || 3  
|-
|-  bgcolor="#CCFFCC"
| 2011-04-16 || Win ||align=left| Alexandru Surcov || KOK Europe Grand Prix 2011 || Chișinău, Moldova || Decision || 3   
|-
! style=background:white colspan=9 |
|-
|-  bgcolor="#FFBBBB"
| 2010-12-11 || Loss ||align=left| Oleksandr Oliynyk || KOK World GP 2010 in Chișinău, Final || Chișinău, Moldova || KO || 3 
|-
! style=background:white colspan=9 |
|-
|-  bgcolor="#CCFFCC"
| 2010-12-11 || Win ||align=left| Hong Tae Seong || KOK World GP 2010 in Chișinău, Semi Finals || Chișinău, Moldova || Decision || 3   
|-
|-  bgcolor="#CCFFCC"
| 2010-12-11 || Win ||align=left| Nahid Asanov || KOK World GP 2010 in Chișinău, Quarter Finals || Chișinău, Moldova || Decision || 3   
|-
|-  bgcolor="#CCFFCC"
| 2010-10-09 || Win ||align=left| Tadas Jonkus || FEA Bushido FC || Chișinău, Moldova || Decision || 3 
|-
|-  bgcolor="#FFBBBB"
| 2010-03-19 ||Loss ||align=left| Tadas Jonkus || K-1 World Max 2010 - East European Tournament || Minsk, Belarus || Decision (split)|| 3 
|-
|-  bgcolor="#CCFFCC"
| 2009-12-16 || Win ||align=left| Nani Vadim || FEA GP 2009, Final || Chișinău, Moldova || KO || 1 
|-
! style=background:white colspan=9 |
|-
|-  bgcolor="#CCFFCC"
| 2009-12-16 || Win ||align=left| David Serghei || FEA GP 2009, Semi Finals || Chișinău, Moldova || KO || 1 
|-
|-  bgcolor="#CCFFCC"
| 2009-12-16 || Win ||align=left| Pavel Doroftei || FEA GP 2009, Quarter Finals || Chișinău, Moldova || KO || 1 
|- 
|-
| colspan=9 | Legend:

See also 
List of male kickboxers

References

1987 births
Living people
Moldovan male kickboxers
Cruiserweight kickboxers
Moldovan Muay Thai practitioners
Democratic Party of Moldova MPs
King of Kings champions